Notocetus is an extinct genus of river dolphin belonging to Squalodelphinidae. Known specimens have been found in Early Miocene marine deposits from Argentina, Italy and Peru.

Taxonomy
Notocetus was unnecessarily given the replacement name Diochoticus by Ameghino (1894) on the false assumption that Notocetus was preoccupied by Notiocetus. Lydekker (1894), meanwhile erected Argyrodelphis for the same specimen. The type species of Otekaikea was once considered a species of Notocetus before being recognized as belonging to Waipatiidae.

Distribution
Fossils of Notocetus have been found in:
 Monte León Formation, Argentina
 Pietra Leccese Formation, Italy
 Chilcatay Formation, Peru

References

Prehistoric cetacean genera
Miocene cetaceans
Miocene mammals of Europe
Fossils of Italy
Miocene mammals of South America
Colhuehuapian
Santacrucian
Neogene Argentina
Fossils of Argentina
Neogene Peru
Fossils of Peru
Fossil taxa described in 1892